"God Is Dead?" is a song by English heavy metal band Black Sabbath, the second track on their nineteenth studio album, 13 (2013). It was released as the album's lead single on 19 April 2013, the first Black Sabbath release with Ozzy Osbourne since "Psycho Man" and "Selling My Soul" from Reunion (1998).

Composition
"God Is Dead?" has been described as a doom metal song. Both the song title and figure on the single's cover, by Heather Cassils, are a reference to Friedrich Nietzsche, a German philosopher who is famous for saying that "God is dead. God remains dead. And we have killed him. How shall we comfort ourselves, the murderers of all murderers?". It is one of Black Sabbath's longer original compositions, second to "Megalomania" off their 1975 album, Sabotage.

Release and reception
The song was released via an MP3 download on Amazon and was also available as a free download to those who pre-ordered the full album on iTunes. The song in its entirety was posted on the official YouTube channel in promotion of this. The music video for the song, directed by Peter Joseph, known for the Zeitgeist film series, was released on 10 June 2013. The song was featured in the second promo for the sixth season of Sons of Anarchy, a FX network television series. 

"God Is Dead?" reached number 6 on the UK Rock Charts. It was ranked the 14th-best Black Sabbath song by Rock - Das Gesamtwerk der größten Rock-Acts im Check. The song later won the Grammy Award for Best Metal Performance on 26 January 2014, the band's first Grammy Award in 14 years. Also in 2014, the song won a Planet Rock Award for Best British Single.

Personnel
Ozzy Osbourne – vocals
Tony Iommi – guitar
Geezer Butler – bass guitar
Additional musician
Brad Wilk – drums

Chart performance

References

External links

Black Sabbath songs
2013 singles
Songs written by Geezer Butler
Songs written by Tony Iommi
Songs written by Ozzy Osbourne
Song recordings produced by Rick Rubin
Grammy Award for Best Metal Performance
2013 songs
Doom metal songs
Vertigo Records singles